Masada: Beit, also known as ב or Masada 2, is a 1995 album by American jazz composer and saxophonist John Zorn.    It is the second album of Masada recordings.

Reception
The Allmusic review by Jim Smith awarded the album 4½ stars stating "John Zorn's absorption of klezmer motifs into avant-garde jazz is remarkable in itself, but even more extraordinary is Masada's utter command of the two genres' fiercely visceral energies... Simply stated, this is one of jazz's greatest groups".

Track listing
All compositions by John Zorn.
 "Piram" - 7:08
 "Hadasha" - 10:05
 "Lachish" - 2:25
 "Rachab" - 4:47
 "Peliyot" - 4:32
 "Achshaph" - 2:44
 "Sansanah" - 7:09
 "Ravayah" - 3:19
 "Sahar" - 6:12
 "Tirzah" - 8:47
 "Shilhim" - 2:18
Recorded at RPM, New York City on February 20, 1994

Personnel
Masada
John Zorn — alto saxophone
Dave Douglas — trumpet
Greg Cohen — bass
Joey Baron — drums

References

1995 albums
Masada (band) albums
albums produced by John Zorn
DIW Records albums